Steponas Babrauskas (born June 20, 1984) is a Lithuanian professional basketball player.

Professional career
Babrauskas was a runner-up in the Lithuanian Basketball League (LKL) with Lietuvos Rytas, in 2004. He won the Latvian Basketball League (LBL) with ASK Riga, in 2007. In 2008, he returned to Lietuvos Rytas, and was named the team's captain. With Rytas, he won the European secondary level EuroCup championship, the Lithuanian League championship, and the Baltic League (BBL) championship. He was one of the most hated opposing players by the rival fans of Žalgiris Kaunas.

He had a brief stint in Turkey, in the 2014-15 season, a year removed after he left Rytas. He played for three seasons with Pieno žvaigždės, with whom he won the Baltic League in 2018. He moved to Dzūkija in 2018.

National team career
Babrauskas' first major achievement in basketball came at the 2003 FIBA Under-19 World Cup in Greece, where he and the Lithuanian Under-19 National Basketball Team won silver medals. He also won a bronze medal at the 2004 FIBA Europe Under-20 Championship, in the Czech Republic. He first won a gold medal at the 2005 FIBA Under-21 World Cup, in Argentina. He also helped the Lithuanian junior team to win gold medals at the 2007 Summer Universiade.

Career statistics

EuroLeague

|-
| style="text-align:left;"| 2009–10
| style="text-align:left;"| Lietuvos Rytas
| 10 || 0 || 20.1 || .368 || .405 || .625 || 2.6 || .3 || .2 || .1 || 7.0 || 2.6
|-
| style="text-align:left;"| 2010–11
| style="text-align:left;"| Lietuvos Rytas
| 14 || 1 || 11.3 || .250 || .471 || .500 || .9 || .2 || .4 || .0 || 2.4 || .8
|-
| style="text-align:left;"| 2012–13
| style="text-align:left;"| Lietuvos Rytas
| 10 || 1 || 23.0 || .280 || .357 || .722 || 3.2 || .5 || .6 || .1 || 5.7 || 3.8
|-
| style="text-align:left;"| 2013–14
| style="text-align:left;"| Lietuvos Rytas
| 10 || 6 || 17.0 || .545 || .261 || .800 || 1.9 || .7 || 1.2 || .0 || 4.2 || 3.1

Awards and honors

Pro clubs
Latvian League Champion: 2007
Baltic League Presidents Cup Winner: 2008
Lithuanian Federation Cup Winner: 2009
EuroCup Champion: 2009
2× Lithuanian League Champion: 2009, 2010

Lithuanian junior national team
2003 FIBA Under-19 World Cup: 
2004 FIBA Europe Under-20 Championship: 
2005 FIBA Under-21 World Cup: 
2007 Summer Universiade:

References
 . Steponas Babrauskas. BC Lietuvos Rytas.

External links
FIBA Profile
Euroleague.net Profile
Eurobasket.com Profile

1984 births
Living people
ASK Riga players
BC Dzūkija players
BC Pieno žvaigždės players
BC Rytas players
İstanbul Büyükşehir Belediyespor basketball players
Leuven Bears players
Lithuanian men's basketball players
Pallacanestro Varese players
People from Trakai
Scafati Basket players
Shooting guards
Small forwards
Universiade medalists in basketball
Universiade gold medalists for Lithuania
Medalists at the 2007 Summer Universiade